This is a list of local government areas (LGAs) in Queensland, sorted by region. For the history and responsibilities of local government in that state, see Local government in Queensland. For former local government areas in Queensland, see List of former local government areas of Queensland.


LGAs sorted by region

See also

 List of former local government areas of Queensland
 List of places in Queensland by population

References

External links

 
Local Government Areas